Shanghai Science and Technology Museum is a station on Shanghai Metro Line 2. It features the large underground AP Plaza shopping mall.

Places nearby
 Shanghai Science and Technology Museum
 Century Avenue
 Century Park
 Pudong New Area Government

References

Shanghai Metro stations in Pudong
Line 2, Shanghai Metro
Railway stations in China opened in 1999
Railway stations in Shanghai